The Pech River is located in eastern Afghanistan.

Course
The Pech River system is fed from glaciers and snow from the Hindu Kush range to its north. The river rises in central Nuristan Province and flows south and southeasterly through the center of Kunar Province, joining the Kunar River (Asmar River, Loy Seend) at the provincial capital of Asadabad. The Kunar River is a tributary of the Kabul River, part of the Indus River basin.

The river has numerous tributaries forming valleys on both sides. These include the Chapa Dara, Waygal, Korangal Valley (site of the film Restrepo), Watapur, and Sharyak valleys.

Culture
In the Pech Valley, Pashto as well as Askunu language is spoken. The Safi tribe of Pashtuns are the majority population in the Pech Valley.

The river's largest settlement is Nangalam, at the confluence of the Waygal River with the Pech River.

Military history
There were a series of U.S. military bases along the Pech River Valley in Kunar Province, including COP Honaker-Miracle, COP Able Main, COP Michigan, and the largest −  FOB Blessing. Most were closed after 2011. In 2011 former FOB Blessing was abandoned by the Afghan National Army (ANA), and the 25th Infantry Division returned to reestablish the area of influence. The new name was COP Nangalam, with a majority of control in the hands of the ANA. In late 2012 with the ANA in control of and the establishment of ANA Fire bases in and along the area that COP Michigan was the U.S. Army's 4th Infantry Division's 4th Brigade Combat Team. U.S. President Barack Obama then pulled the American forces from the valley again, ceding it to the Taliban due to the questionable ability and loyalty of the (ANA).

The 2012 book "Siren's Song: The Allure of War", by Antonio Salinas, depicts the experience of an American Platoon operating in the Pech River Valley.

The 2016 book "Hammerhead Six: How Green Berets Waged an Unconventional War Against the Taliban to Win in Afghanistan's Deadly Pech Valley", By Ronald Fry with Tad Tuleja, depicts one Special Forces team and how they use mutual cultural respect opposed to force to defeat the Taliban and build alliances between the US and local Afghans.

See also
 
 List of rivers of Afghanistan

References

External links

Rivers of Afghanistan
Kabul River
Landforms of Kunar Province
Landforms of Nuristan Province
Rivers of Pakistan

simple:Peche River